Radha Krishna Gupta Adarsh Vidyalaya Inter College is a college of the Uttar Pradesh State Board, located in East Dildar Nagar area.

Background
Radha Krishna Gupta Adarsh Vidyalaya Inter College was established in 1947 with the objective of catering to the educational requirements of the densely populated East Dildarnagar area. The college is fully funded by the Govt. of NCT of Uttar Pradesh. The college has now shifted to its modern and spacious building complex in Dildarnagar.

Infrastructure
It has a state of the art auditorium, a computer centre, fully computerised Library, well equipped laboratories, state - of - the - art conference hall etc. The new building complex has acquired several new facilities.

References

Intermediate colleges in Uttar Pradesh
Education in Ghazipur district
Dildarnagar
Educational institutions established in 1952
1952 establishments in Uttar Pradesh